Tatyana Mikhailovna Ledovskaya (born 21 May 1966 in Shchyokino, Tula Oblast) is a retired athlete who competed mainly in the 400 metres hurdles. She represented the Soviet Union and later, Belarus, training in Minsk.

Biography
She competed for the USSR in the 1988 Summer Olympics held in Seoul, South Korea in the 400 metre hurdles, where she won the silver medal.  She followed this up with a leg in the 4 x 400 metres relay where she won the gold medal with her teammates individual gold medalist Olga Bryzgina, individual bronze medalist Olga Nazarova and Mariya Pinigina, setting a new world record of 3:15.17 minutes which is still unbeaten.  Ledovskaya is also the 1991 World Champion in 400 m hurdles and 4 × 400 m relay. She later represented Belarus, including at the 1996 Olympics.

Ledovskaya was awarded the Order of the Badge of Honor.

Achievements

References

External links

 Biography and photo

1966 births
Living people
Belarusian female hurdlers
Soviet female hurdlers
Athletes (track and field) at the 1988 Summer Olympics
Athletes (track and field) at the 1992 Summer Olympics
Athletes (track and field) at the 1996 Summer Olympics
Olympic athletes of the Soviet Union
Olympic athletes of the Unified Team
Olympic athletes of Belarus
Olympic gold medalists for the Soviet Union
Olympic silver medalists for the Soviet Union
People from Tula Oblast
World Athletics Championships medalists
European Athletics Championships medalists
World Athletics record holders (relay)
Belarusian people of Russian descent
Medalists at the 1988 Summer Olympics
Olympic gold medalists in athletics (track and field)
Olympic silver medalists in athletics (track and field)
World Athletics Championships winners
Universiade medalists in athletics (track and field)
Universiade silver medalists for the Soviet Union